Resurrection is a lost 1912 silent drama short film based on the 1899 novel Resurrection (Voskraeseniye) by Count Leo Tolstoy. It was directed by Joseph A. Golden, produced by Adolph Zukor and released by Famous Players Film Company, It is the first original film Zukor ever produced in contrast to the famous Les Amours de la reine Élisabeth starring Sarah Bernhardt which was made in France and which he bought the U.S. distribution rights.

Resurrection starred Blanche Walsh, a famous American stage star of the day, who had played in Resurrection on Broadway. This would be Walsh's only film as she died three years later.

D. W. Griffith had filmed a version of the story in 1909. Filmed versions followed in 1918 with Pauline Frederick, 1927 with Dolores del Río and 1931 with Lupe Vélez.

Cast
Blanche Walsh - Katyusha
Sydney Mason - Prince Nekhlyudov
Nicholas Dunaew - Smelkov
Carey Lee - Tavern Girl

See also
Resurrection (1909)
A Woman's Resurrection (1915)
Resurrection (1918)
Resurrection (1927)
Resurrection (1931 English)
Resurrection (1931 Spanish)
We Live Again (1934)
Resurrection (1943)
Resurrection (1944)
Resurrection (1958)
Resurrection (1960)
Anantha Rathriya (1996)

References

External links
Resurrection at IMDb.com

1912 films
American silent feature films
Films based on Resurrection
Lost American films
Paramount Pictures short films
American black-and-white films
Silent American drama films
1912 drama films
Films set in Russia
1912 lost films
Lost drama films
Films directed by Joseph A. Golden
1910s English-language films
1910s American films